Harrogate (Stonefall) Cemetery is a Commonwealth War Graves Commission (CWGC) burial ground for the dead of the First World War and Second World War located on the outskirts of Harrogate in North Yorkshire, England.

The cemetery grounds are located next to the main municipal cemetery and crematorium for the district, in Wetherby Road.

Foundation
This area of Yorkshire had many RAF bases during the Second World War. In particular, No 6 RCAF Bomber Group had headquarters at Allerton Park in nearby Knaresborough.

An area of the municipal cemetery was set aside for use as a war cemetery at the start of the war and received burials, mostly from after July 1943, mostly airmen, mostly Canadians, until after the end of the war. Burials are from northern airfields and the military wing of the now demolished Harrogate General Hospital in Starbeck.

Within the cemetery, there are burials of or special memorials to 23 First World War troops which are dispersed across the municipal part of the cemetery.

Notable graves

Many of the burials are from aircrews killed in training or on the ground or who died later in the local hospital. Amongst the burials in the cemetery are three (all Canadians) of the seven crew of a Lancaster bomber that crashed on Helmsley Moor on the morning of 17 May 1944. Five burials (all serving in the RCAF, but two were from the United States) in adjoining plots are of the crew of Halifax bomber EB203, which crashed into a railway bridge in Bishop Monkton on 15 April 1944.

Crash of Wellington BK387
Wellington BK387 crashed near Oakworth, Yorkshire on the night of 2 January 1944. The main force of Bomber Command was out in strength that night and 383 aircraft were on their way to Berlin. The Operational Training Unit (O.T.U.) was based at Ossington eight miles north-west of Newark and it was from bases like these, flying the Vickers Wellington, that all operational crew passed through on their way to squadron service.

At 20.00 hours, Wellington BK387 lifted off from the Ossington runway on what should have been just another training flight of four hours duration. The pilot, Warrant Officer Ernest Glass, brought the aircraft down through low cloud and subsequently crashed into the hillside at Tewitt Hall wood. Six young people died in an instant. The crew of BK387 were all from Canada. If they had completed their training they would have joined one of the 16 Canadian Bomber Squadrons in Yorkshire. The remains of the aircraft were cleared away and little remains today at the site of the crash except for the burnt and broken trees. The crew were all buried at Stonefall Cemetery along with many of their fellow countrymen. All are buried on section C, row H, graves 11 to 16.

The cause of this crash is unclear. The Canadian crewed Wellington BK387 was on a night training exercise when the aircraft descended through cloud and crashed into farmland. One witness account suggests Warrant Officer Glass was trying to land the plane in the fields. This same account quotes the landlord of the nearby Grouse Inn, who says he had gone to his outside toilet and, with the door open (after all the customers had gone home for the night...) "he sat there frightened out of his skin as he could see the plane heading straight for his loo". The Wellington crashed just beyond the pub.

The crew of BK387 were:
Warrant Officer E. I. Glass (Pilot)
Flying Officer J. J. McHenry (Navigator)
Warrant Officer J. E. Dalling, (Bomb Aimer)
Warrant Officer J. Henfrey (Wireless Operator)
Sergeant E. Savage (Air Gunner)
Sergeant N. W. Crawford (Air Gunner)

Special memorials
A special memorial commemorates six First World War troops whose graves are in local churchyards around Yorkshire and cannot be maintained by the Commission. The actual grave of one of those commemorated, Edgar Audsley, has since been destroyed as part of development works on the site of South Ossett Baptist Burial Ground.

A plaque in the cemetery records the names of 12 servicemen of he Second World War who were cremated at Harrogate Crematorium.

References

External links

 
 War Graves Photography Project
 

Commonwealth War Graves Commission cemeteries in England
Buildings and structures in Harrogate
Cemeteries in North Yorkshire